The Fiat CR.25 was an Italian twin-engine reconnaissance-fighter aircraft which served in small numbers for the Regia Aeronautica during World War II.

History
40 CR.25s were ordered (later reduced to ten, the two prototypes and other eight airplanes) after the operative failure of the apparently more promising Breda Ba.88 bomber. Later, it was decided to use the CR.25 as a reconnaissance plane and as escort fighter, with a total of nine aircraft (a prototype and the eight pre-production aircraft) for this role. It was used during the war by the 173a Squadriglia Ricognizione Strategica Terrestre (Strategic Land Reconnaissance Squadron), operating from Sicily. Despite positive reports from the pilots, and a proposal by Fiat to resume production, no further aircraft were produced.

The prototype MM 332, refurbished as personnel transport, was assigned to the Italian embassy in Berlin.

Variants

 CR.25 : Twin-engined reconnaissance bomber aircraft, two prototypes built.
 CR.25bis : Strategic reconnaissance aircraft, long-range escort fighter aircraft, eight preproduction aircraft built.
 CR.25 D : The prototype MM (Matricola Militare) 332 aircraft, redesignated CR.25 D as a transport for the Italian air attaché in Berlin.
 CR.25quater : The CR.25quater,  was a more heavily armed version with a slight increase in wing area and 1175 HP engines proposed from FIAT in the spring of 1943. It remained on the drawing tables.

Operators

Regia Aeronautica

Specifications (CR.25bis)

See also

References

 Fiat CR.25
 Garello, GianCarlo. CR 25. Turin: La Bancarella Aeronautica, 1997.
 
 

CR.25
1930s Italian bomber aircraft
1930s Italian patrol aircraft
Aircraft first flown in 1937
Twin piston-engined tractor aircraft